The United States Pony Clubs, Inc or USPC is an American association of pony clubs. It was established in 1954, and was based on the model of the Pony Club of Great Britain, established in 1929. The national office is in Lexington, Kentucky.

Despite the word "pony" in the name of the organization, there is no limit on the size of horse that may participate in events; when the club started, only riders under twenty-one were accepted.

History 

The club is a loose confederation of regional or local pony clubs in the United States, often organized at town or county level. It was established in 1954, and was based on the example of the Pony Club of Great Britain (founded in 1929); the two clubs were not affiliated. The USPC initially consisted of twelve clubs. By 1980 there more than three hundred member clubs, with a total membership of some 8500 young people.

Activities 
The club operates a certification system for riders, with four levels from D up to A. Levels D and C are awarded by local clubs,  levels B and A by a nationallycertified examiner; the requirements for level A are stringent, and the number of annual recipients may be only in double figures.

Local member clubs may organize competitions, known as "rallies". The competition consists of five parts: a written test of knowledge of horsemanship and horse care; a practical test of stable management and safety; and offers competitive programs in dressage, eventing, games, gymkhana (timed obstacle racing), horse management, polocrosse, tetrathlon, western dressage and show jumping. Resource programs, primarily educational, are offered in distance riding, driving, fox hunting, hunter seat, polo and vaulting (gymnastics on horseback). 

There is also the United States Pony Club National Championships each year.  All Pony Club Members must qualify to compete in the event. Championship teams are formed with members from different clubs and centers throughout each region.

References

Further reading 

  Robert R. Morris (2004). The United States Pony Clubs, Inc., 1954/2004: A Story to Tell. Virginia Beach, Virginia: The Donning Company. 

Sports organizations established in 1954
Youth organizations based in the United States
Equestrian organizations headquartered in Kentucky